The Bodyguard: Original Soundtrack Album is a soundtrack album from the film of the same name, released on November 17, 1992, by Arista Records. The album's first side (in its original LP and cassette formats) features songs recorded by American singer Whitney Houston, who starred in the film, while side two features the work of various artists. Houston and Clive Davis were co-executive producers of the record.

The Bodyguard was praised by music critics for Houston's vocal performance and its production. The album was a massive global success, hitting number one in eighteen countries and going top ten in dozens of other countries. In the United States, the album gave Houston the distinction of having the most weeks at number one by a female artist on Billboard 200, holding that record for 19 years until being surpassed by Adele's album 21 (2011). The Bodyguard is certified Diamond by the Recording Industry Association of America, which gives Houston three Diamond selling albums.
It became the first album verified by the Nielsen SoundScan to sell over one million copies within a single week. At one point, the album was selling over a million copies per week for several weeks in a row. With sales of over 45 million copies worldwide, The Bodyguard  is the best-selling soundtrack album of all-time, as well as the best selling album by a woman in music history, and the best selling album of the decade. The soundtrack won the Grammy Award for Album of the Year. 

In honor of the 25th anniversary of the soundtrack's release, Legacy Recordings and the Whitney Houston Estate released I Wish You Love: More from The Bodyguard, which included a collection of never-before-released live recordings from Houston's historic The Bodyguard World Tour (1993–1994), alternate versions of the audio recordings from The Bodyguard film, and an alternate version of a remix of "I’m Every Woman".

Background
Houston and Clive Davis served as co-executive producers of the album. Houston planned to record "What Becomes of the Broken Hearted" as the film's theme song; however, when they learned Paul Young's version would be used in the film Fried Green Tomatoes, they searched for another song. Kevin Costner, the film's co-star, thought of recording "I Will Always Love You", originally released by Dolly Parton. While recording the album, Houston insisted on using her touring band as opposed to a studio band.

Music
The album's first half features six pop songs performed by Houston. Houston's cover of Dolly Parton's plaintive country ballad "I Will Always Love You" is a grand pop-gospel declaration of lasting devotion to a departing lover. "I Have Nothing" and "Run to You" are ballads featuring Houston's characteristic stentorian delivery, and both received Oscar nominations. "Jesus Loves Me" is sung with Bebe Winans and features a pop arrangement.

AllMusic editor Stephen Thomas Erlewine views that the first half is characterized by urban pop songs similar to I'm Your Baby Tonight (1990), while the second half has miscellaneous tracks more "typical of a big-budget soundtrack", including an excerpt from Alan Silvestri's score, instrumentals by Kenny G, and contemporary pop and dance songs. "Someday (I'm Coming Back)", performed by Lisa Stansfield, is an intense pop-disco song.

Singles
The album is most notable for Houston's version of "I Will Always Love You" (written by Dolly Parton). The song received huge airplay, appealing to the pop, R&B, adult contemporary, and soul radio markets. The single spent 14 weeks at number one on the Billboard Hot 100 singles chart. "I Will Always Love You" was successful worldwide, peaking at number one for 14 weeks in New Zealand, 10 weeks in the UK and Australia, 9 weeks in Norway, 8 weeks in France and Switzerland, 6 weeks in the Netherlands, and 3 weeks in Sweden.

With the next two Top 5 singles "I'm Every Woman" (originally a Chaka Khan hit) and "I Have Nothing", following on the heels of "I Will Always Love You", Houston became the first female act to have three songs in the Top 20 simultaneously.
Two songs, "Run to You" and "I Have Nothing", were each nominated for the Academy Award for Best Original Song, but lost out to "A Whole New World" from the animated film Aladdin. The same two songs were nominated for Grammy Awards in the category Best Song Written Specifically for a Motion Picture or for Television. Other songs garnering significant radio airplay included "Jesus Loves Me" on gospel stations, and "Queen of the Night" on pop and dance stations.

Commercial performance
The Bodyguard debuted at number two on the Billboard 200 chart and the Billboard Top R&B/Hip-Hop Albums chart, behind Ice Cube's The Predator, selling 144,500 copies in its first week. In its second week, the album topped both of the charts, with sales of 292,000 units. While the album stayed the summit on the charts, it broke the record for the most one-week sales twice. In its fifth week, it sold 831,000 copies, breaking the old sales record of 770,000 set by Guns N' Roses' Use Your Illusion II in the fall of 1991. The following week, the album once again set a record for the most albums sold in a single week, since the Nielsen SoundScan introduced a computerized sales monitoring system in May 1991; when it sold 1,061,000 copies, making it the first album to sell over 1 million copies in one week since tracking began. The soundtrack stayed at number one for 20 non-consecutive weeks on the Billboard 200 chart, and spent eight consecutive weeks atop the Top R&B Albums chart, remaining on the charts for a total of 141 weeks and 122 weeks, respectively. The album held the record for the most weeks at number one, and the record for the most non-consecutive chart-topping weeks on the Billboard 200 chart in the Nielsen SoundScan era until 2012 when it was overtaken by Adele's 21 which spent 24 non-consecutive weeks at the summit.

The Bodyguard soundtrack was ranked #1 in the 1993 Billboard year-end charts, on the Top Billboard 200 Album and Top R&B/Hip-Hop Album. In addition, the album was the first in Nielsen SoundScan history to rank among the top three albums in two consecutive years (#3 for 1992, #1 for 1993), and the best-selling soundtrack by the National Association of Recording Merchandisers (NARM) in 1993–1994. When the soundtrack to The Bodyguard was credited as a Whitney Houston album in Billboard archives, she became the only artist with three albums to remain on top of the Billboard 200 chart for over ten weeksㅡWhitney Houston (14 weeks), Whitney (11 weeks) and The Bodyguard (20 weeks).  Houston also broke the record for the most cumulative weeks at number one by a female artist with 46 cumulative weeks until Taylor Swift surpassed it on 2020 with her album "Folklore".

The album received the largest initial certification of any album for 6× platinum by the Recording Industry Association of America(RIAA) on January 18, 1993. The record was broken by 'N SYNC's No Strings Attached, certified 7× Platinum initially in April 2000. On March 16, 1999, when the RIAA launched the Diamond Awards, honoring sales of 10 million copies or more of an album or single, the album received the award with 62 other albums initially. It was certified 17× Platinum by the RIAA on November 1, 1999, becoming the best-selling soundtrack album of all-time in United States. According to a new update from Whitney Houston's estate, particularly, Arista, The Bodyguard soundtrack has been certified 18× Platinum by RIAA in November 2017. It is the first album to reach both the 10 million and 11 million sales mark in the US since 1991, when Nielsen SoundScan started tracking music sales. As of late 2014, it had sold 12,140,000 copies; it is the sixth best-selling album of the SoundScan era in the United States.

In 1992–1993, with the huge international success of the film The Bodyguard, the soundtrack was also a phenomenal hit worldwide. It topped the albums chart in Australia for five weeks, Austria for nine weeks, Canada for 12 weeks, France for eight weeks, Germany for 11 weeks, Hungary for two weeks, Italy for two weeks, Japan for two weeks, Netherlands for six weeks, New Zealand for eight weeks, Norway for six weeks, Sweden for four weeks and Switzerland for nine weeks. In the United Kingdom, the album didn't chart on the main albums chart because compilation albums were excluded from the main albums chart from January 1989. Instead, the album reached the top on the official compilation albums chart and stayed there for 11 weeks, spending 60 non-consecutive weeks in the top 10 and for a total of 107 weeks on the chart. Through its massive success across Europe, it topped the European Top 100 Albums chart for 15 non-consecutive weeks.
In the UK, the album was certified 7× platinum by the British Phonographic Industry (BPI) on January 1, 1994, and has sold 2,255,000 copies, landing at number sixty on the list of UK's 100 best-selling albums of all time. In Japan, it was certified 2× million by the Recording Industry Association of Japan (RIAJ) in 1994, the first time a foreign artist achieved that feat in Japanese music history, and eventually became the best-selling foreign album with 2.8 million copies sold. The record was later broken by Mariah Carey's #1's, certified 3× million in 1998. In Germany, the album has sold more than 1.7 million, earning 3× platinum awards by the Bundesverband Musikindustrie (BVMI). In addition, it was awarded Diamond for the sales of over 1 million in both France and Canada. It was certified 3× platinum in Brazil, becoming one of the best-selling international album by a female artist and set a record for the best-selling foreign album with the sales of 1.2 million over in South Korea. In Australia, it became the best selling album of 1993. In Mexico, the soundtrack sold more than 500,000 copies, making it the best-selling English-language record in 1994. To date, the album has sold 45 million copies worldwide, making it the best-selling soundtrack of all time.

I Wish You Love: More from The Bodyguard

I Wish You Love: More from the Bodyguard is the 25th anniversary reissue of the album, released by Legacy Recordings on November 17, 2017. The album was released to commemorate the 25th anniversary of the movie, The Bodyguard, which marked Houston's film debut. It includes the film versions of her six Bodyguard contributions – "I Will Always Love You", "I Have Nothing", "I'm Every Woman", "Run to You", "Queen of the Night" and "Jesus Loves Me" – as well as remixes and live performances of the songs from subsequent tours.

The album's release coincided with a tribute to Houston and the music of The Bodyguard at the American Music Awards on Nov. 19 on ABC as performed by Christina Aguilera. Ahead of the performance, Aguilera wrote on Instagram, “I am excited, honored and humbled to perform a tribute to one of my idols.”

Track listing
All songs performed by Whitney Houston, except where noted.

Notes
 On the US edition, Kenny G's "Waiting for You" was not included, with Alan Silvestri's "Theme from The Bodyguard" appearing in its track place (before Joe Cocker feat. Sass Jordan's "Trust in Me")

Personnel

"I Will Always Love You"
Whitney Houston – vocals, vocal arrangement
David Foster – producer, arranger
Rickey Minor – director
Kirk Whalum – saxophone & solo
Ricky Lawson – drums
David Foster – keyboard
Dean Parks & Michael Landau – guitars
Neil Stubenhaus – bass
Tony Smith & Claude Gaudette – synth programming
Bill Schnee, Dave Reitzas & Peter J. Yianilos – recording engineers
Dave Reitzas – mixing engineer
Hal Belknap – assistant mixing engineer

"I Have Nothing"
Whitney Houston – vocals
Jeremy Lubbock – string arrangement
David Foster – keyboards, bass, string arrangement, producer, arranger
Michael Landau – guitar
Simon Franglen – Synclavier and synth programming
Dave Reitzas – recording engineer
Mick Guzauski – mixing engineer

"I'm Every Woman"
Whitney Houston – vocals
Narada Michael Walden – producer
Robert Clivilles – additional vocal arrangement and production, remix
David Cole – additional vocal arrangement and production, remix
Vocal arrangement inspired by Chaka Khan
Louis Biancaniello – programming
James Alfano – programming
Chauncey Mahan – programming
Matt Rohr – recording engineer
Marc Reyburn – recording engineer
Acar S. Key – additional production recording engineer
Bob Rosa – mixing engineer

"Run to You"
Whitney Houston – vocals
David Foster – producer, arrangement, string arrangement, bass
Jud Friedman – arrangement, keyboards
William Ross – string arrangement
John Robinson – drums
Dean Parks – acoustic guitar
Simon Franglen – Synclavier and synth programming
Dave Reitzas – recording engineer
Mick Guzauski – mixing engineer

"Queen of the Night"
Whitney Houston – vocals, co-producer, vocal arrangement
L.A. Reid – producer, drum programming
Babyface – producer, keyboard, organ, bass and drum programming
Daryl Simmons – co-producer
Kayo – bass
Donald Parks – programming
Randy Walker – programming
Vernon Reid – guitar solo
Barney Perkins – recording engineer
Milton Chan – recording engineer
Dave Way – mixing engineer
Jim "Z" Zumpano – mixing engineer

"Jesus Loves Me"
Whitney Houston – vocals, producer, vocal arrangement
BeBe Winans – vocals, background vocals
Cedric J. Caldwell – arrangement
BeBe Winans – vocal arrangement, arrangement
Ron Huff – string arrangement
Richard Joseph – additional production recording engineer
Alvin Chea – background vocals
Claude McKnight III – background vocals
Paul Jackson Jr. – guitar
Victor Caldwell – bass, drum programming, recording engineer
Mike McCarthy – recording engineer
Dave Reitzas – mixing engineer

"Even If My Heart Would Break"
Kenny G – performer, arrangement
Aaron Neville – performer
David Foster – producer, arranger
Walter Afanasieff – producer, piano, drum programming, bass and organ
Randy Kerber – keyboards
John Robinson – drums
Michael Thompson – guitar
Ren Klyce – synth programming
Gary Cirimelli – synth programming
Humberto Gatica – recording engineer
Manny LaCarrubba – additional engineering
Dana Jon Chappelle – additional engineering
Steve Sheppard – additional engineering
Kevin Becka – additional engineering, assistant engineer
Steve Sheppard – assistant engineer
Mick Guzauski – mixing engineer

"Someday (I'm Coming Back)"
Lisa Stansfield – vocals
Ian Devaney – producer- mixing
Andy Morris – producer, mixing
Jazz Summers – executive producer
Tim Parry – executive producer
Bobby Boughton – engineer, mixing

"It's Gonna Be a Lovely Day"
The S.O.U.L. S.Y.S.T.E.M. – performer
Michelle Visage – featured artist
Robert Clivilles – producer, arranger, mixing, rap vocal production
David Cole – producer, arranger, mixing, vocal arrangement
Ricky Crespo – assistant producer
Duran Ramos – rap vocal production
Acar S. Key – recording and mixing engineer
Bruce Miller – additional mixing

"(What's So Funny 'Bout) Peace, Love and Understanding?"
Curtis Stigers – performer
Danny Kortchmar – producer
Marc DeSisto – recording and mix engineer

"Theme from The Bodyguard"
Alan Silvestri – composer, producer
William Ross – orchestrations
Gary Grant – trumpet solo
Dennis Sands – engineer
Bill Easystone – assistant engineer
Gary Carlson – technical engineer
Jim Walker – technical engineer

"Trust in Me"
Joe Cocker – vocals
Sass Jordan – featured artist
Charlie Midnight – producer
John Rollo – recording engineer
Chris Lord-Alge – mixing engineer

Production and design
Clive Davis – executive producer
Whitney Houston – executive producer
Roy Lott – producer
Gary LeMel – Warner Bros. music executive
Maureen Crowe – music supervisor
George Marino – mastering
Susan Mendola – design
Ben Glass – The Bodyguard still photography, inside front cover photo of Whitney Houston
Randee St. Nicholas – inside booklet photography of Whitney Houston
Ellin LaVar – hair
Quietfire – makeup
Stephen Earabino – styling
Matthew Rolston – photography (Kenny G)
Casado – photography (Aaron Neville)
Paul Cox – photography (Joe Cocker)
Moshe Brakha – photography (Sass Jordan)
Zanna – photography (Lisa Stansfield)
Ken Nahoum – photography (The S.O.U.L. S.Y.S.T.E.M.)
Terence Scott – photography (Curtis Stigers)

Charts

Weekly charts

Year-end charts

Decade-end charts

All-time charts

Notes:
A^ In the UK, compilation albums were excluded from the main album chart from January 1989. The Bodyguard Soundtrack was classified as a compilation album for chart purposes and peaked at #1 on the compilations chart, not the main albums chart.

Certifications and sales

See also
List of accolades received by The Bodyguard (1992 film)
List of Top 25 albums for 1993 in Australia
List of best-selling albums
List of best-selling albums by women
List of best-selling albums in Europe
List of best-selling albums in Brazil
List of best-selling albums in Chile
List of best-selling albums in France
List of best-selling albums in Germany
List of best-selling albums in Indonesia
List of best-selling albums in Italy
List of best-selling albums in Japan
List of best-selling albums in South Korea
List of best-selling albums in Taiwan
List of best-selling albums in the United Kingdom
List of best-selling albums in the United States

References

External links
 The Bodyguard: Original Soundtrack Album at Allmusic
 The Bodyguard: Original Soundtrack Album at Discogs

Whitney Houston albums
Grammy Award for Album of the Year
Juno Award for International Album of the Year albums
Albums produced by Narada Michael Walden
Albums produced by Clive Davis
1992 soundtrack albums
Arista Records soundtracks
Albums produced by L.A. Reid
Albums produced by Babyface (musician)
Albums produced by Whitney Houston
Romance film soundtracks
Thriller film soundtracks
Various artists albums
Single-artist film soundtracks